Stacy Collins (born September 10, 1975) is an American football coach and former player. He is currently the special teams coordinator, outside linebackers, and nickels coach at Penn State University. Collins served as the head football coach at the South Dakota School of Mines and Technology from 2012 through 2015.

Playing career
Collins played linebacker for Western Oregon from 1993 through 1997, while completing his degree in physical education.

Coaching career

Western Oregon
Following his playing career, Collins joined the coaching staff at Western Oregon as the special teams coordinator and linebackers coach from 1998 to 2001, while also completing his master's degree in education.

Vienna Vikings
Collins also served as the defensive coordinator for the Vienna Vikings of the Austrian Football League from 1999 to 2001. He also served a stint as the Interim Head Coach.

South Dakota Mines (first stop)
For the 2002 season, Collins was the defensive coordinator and the  special teams coordinator at South Dakota Mines.

Western Washington
The following season, Collins returned to the West Coast. He spent two seasons (2003–2004) coaching the linebackers and coordinating the special teams at Western Washington. While here, Collins helped develop future National Football League (NFL) punter Michael Koenen.

Idaho State
Collins moved on to Idaho State for the 2005 and 2006 football seasons, coaching the linebackers for the Bengals.

Southern Oregon
Collins was the defensive coordinator at Southern Oregon. He also served as the recruiting coordinator.

Central Washington
Collins spent 2008 through 2010 at Central Washington. He spent all three years as the special teams coordinator, while coaching the defensive line in 2008 and 2009, and the linebackers in 2010.

Portland State
For the 2011 season, Collins served as the special teams coordinator for the Portland State Vikings football team.

South Dakota Mines (second stop)
In 2012, Collins returned to South Dakota Mines for his first head coaching opportunity. In his four seasons at the helm, Collins led the Hardrockers to two winning seasons, making the total winning seasons in 30 seasons three. Although also served as the special teams coordinator, Collins’ teams saw historic offensive success, breaking numerous offensive records with a wide-open, pass-heavy, explosive scheme. At the time of Collins’ departure, He was sixth on the all-time wins list at South Dakota Mines.

Utah State
Following his success at South Dakota Mines, Collins Joined Matt Wells’ Staff at Utah State as the special teams coordinator for the 2016 season. In 2017 and 2018, Collins transitioned to coaching the inside linebackers. Following Wells’ departure for Texas Tech prior to the 2019, Collins was retained by returning head coach Gary Andersen. He moved to the offensive side of the ball coaching the running backs, as well as taking over the special teams duties again.

On January 15, 2020, it was announced that Collins would be promoted to co-coordinate the defense, and would switch positional responsibilities from running backs to defensive backs.

Boise State
In January 2021, Collins was hired by Andy Avalos at Boise State to coordinate the special teams and coach the "edge" outside linebacker position on defense.

Personal life

Collins and his wife, Mandi, have four daughters, Kayla, Mackenzie, Kylee and Mackenna.

Head coaching record

References

External links
 Boise State profile

1975 births
Living people
American football linebackers
Boise State Broncos football coaches
Central Washington Wildcats football coaches
Idaho State Bengals football coaches
Portland State Vikings football coaches
South Dakota Mines Hardrockers football coaches
Southern Oregon Raiders football coaches
Utah State Aggies football coaches
Western Oregon Wolves football coaches
Western Oregon Wolves football players
Western Washington Vikings football coaches
People from Douglas County, Oregon
Coaches of American football from Oregon
Players of American football from Oregon
American expatriate sportspeople in Austria